Vincent Cerutti (born 16 March 1981) is a French radio and television presenter.

Radio career 
At the age of 14, he began his radio career by a training course with community radios. He followed on MFM Radio from 2001 to 2005, on Bel RTL for a few months in 2004, and on Chérie FM in 2007. In summer 2010, he joined the radio station RTL, that gave him the opportunity of two hours of daily presenting from Monday to Friday during both months of July and August. After a break, he made his return on RTL in summer 2011 presenting the program Stop ou encore, replacing Vincent Perrot, as well as co-hosting Itinéraire d'un auditeur gâté with Jean-Sébastien Petitdemange.

In March 2013, he briefly presented the program Le Grand Morning on RTL2. Since September 2013, and for one season, he joined the station RFM where he presented the Interview V.I.P., from two to four Friday evenings every month. Since September 2014, he presents the morning section on Chérie FM.

Television career 
In 2000, he is the official speaker of the 24 Hours of Le Mans and then made his television debut on the channel AB Moteurs. He became in 2004 the voice-over of television programs and documentaries on the Tour de France à la voile. In 2006, he became the presenter and the co-producer of the program On Fait Le Plein !, 90 minutes in direct every Friday evenings on the local channel Le Mans Télévision, broadcast on the DTT of cities like Le Mans, Laval, Angers, Blois and Tours.

In September 2009, Vincent Cerutti joined the team of Morandini ! on channel Direct 8, where he presented a chronicle titled Quiz sur les coulisses des médias and a few reports, a collaboration that he will not follow. In January 2010 for TF1 Production, he is the correspondent in the backstage of the NRJ Music Awards, where he interviews several personalities.

He then joined the channel TF1 and presented in January 2011 Sosie ! Or Not Sosie ?, a new entertainment program with sketches filmed in candid camera. The same year, the channel selected him to present Danse avec les stars with Sandrine Quétier, the first season is broadcast in February and March, and the second season in September and October. During his first year on TF1, he presented 17 programs in total in primetime. He then co-hosted, still with Sandrine Quétier, the following seasons of Danse avec les stars on the same channel until the fifth season in 2014. Since February 2014, he presents the lottery draw, alternatively with Sandrine Quétier, Estelle Denis, and Jean-Pierre Foucault.

In 2017 he participated in season 8 of Danse avec les stars (the French version of Dancing with the Stars) with his partner Katrina Patchett and finished in last place.

Danse avec les stars
 In 2017 he participated in season 8 of Danse avec les stars (the French version of Dancing with the Stars) with his partner Katrina Patchett and finished in last place.
This table shows the route of Vincent Cerutti and Katrina Patchett in Danse Avec Les Stars.

See also 
Danse avec les stars

References

External links 

1981 births
Living people
French radio presenters
French television presenters
French people of Italian descent
People from Le Mans